Complement 4 deficiency is a genetic condition affecting complement component 4.

It can present with lupus-like symptoms.

References

External links 

Complement deficiency